A compulsory license provides that the owner of a patent or copyright licenses the use of their rights against payment either set by law or determined through some form of adjudication or arbitration. In essence, under a compulsory license, an individual or company seeking to use another's intellectual property can do so without seeking the rights holder's consent, and pays the rights holder a set fee for the license. This is an exception to the general rule under intellectual property laws that the intellectual property owner enjoys exclusive rights that it may license – or decline to license – to others.

Under UK patent law, a compulsory license is different from a statutory license. Under statutory license, the rate is fixed by law, whereas in case of compulsory license, the rate is left to be negotiated or decided in court.

Copyright law 

In a number of countries, copyright law provides for compulsory licenses of copyrighted works for specific uses. In many cases the remuneration or royalties received for a copyrighted work under compulsory license are specified by local law, but may also be subject to negotiation. Compulsory licensing may be established through negotiating licenses that provide terms within the parameters of the compulsory license. Essentially compulsory licensing provide that copyright owners may only exercise the exclusive rights granted to them under copyright law in a certain way and through a certain system.

Berne Convention 
Article 11bis(2) and Article 13(1) of the Berne Convention for the Protection of Literary and Artistic Works provide the legal basis for compulsory licensing at the international level. They specify under which conditions members to the Berne Convention may determine or impose conditions under which exclusive rights may be exercised, for example through compulsory licensing. The Berne Convention states that member states are free to determine the conditions under which certain exclusive rights may be exercised in their national laws. They also provide for the minimum requirements to be set when compulsory licenses are applied, such as that they must not prejudice the author's right to fair compensation.

Article 11bis(2)states that:

It shall be a matter for legislation in the country of the Union to determine the conditions under which the rights mentioned in the preceding paragraph may be exercised, but these conditions shall apply only in the countries where they have been prescribed. They shall not in any circumstances be prejudicial to the moral rights of the author, nor to his right to obtain equitable remuneration which, in the absence of agreement, shall be fixed by competent authority.

The "preceding article" mentioned in Article 11bis(2) is Article 11bis(1), which establishes that:

Authors of literary and artistic works shall enjoy the exclusive right of authorising: (i) the broadcasting of their works or the communication thereof to the public by any other means of wireless diffusion of signs, sounds or images; (ii) any communication to the public by wire or by rebroadcasting of the broadcast of the work, when this communication is made by an organisation other than the original one; (iii) the public communication by loudspeaker or any other analogous instrument transmitting, by signs, sounds or images, the broadcast of the work.

Article 13(1) states that:

Each country of the Union may impose for itself reservations and conditions on the exclusive right granted to the author of a music work and to the author of any words, the recording of which together with the music work has already been authorised by the latter, to authorise the sound recording of that musical work, together with such words, if any; but all such reservations and conditions shall apply only in the countries which have imposed them and shall not, in any circumstances, be prejudicial to the rights of these authors to obtain equitable remuneration which, in the absence of agreement, shall be fixed by competent authority.

In addition to the exclusive rights mentioned in Article 11bis(1) and 13(1) the Berne Convention also provides that members may determine or impose such conditions for the exercise of exclusive rights in cases where an exclusive right is not provided as remuneration right and not as an exclusive right of authorisation, for example in the case of the resale right, or droit de suite (Article 14ter), and the so-called "Article 12 rights" of performers and producers of phonograms. Members to the Berne Convention may also determine or impose such conditions where the restriction of an exclusive right to the mere right to remuneration is allowed, for example the right to reproduction (Article 9(2)), and in the case of "residual rights", that is, a right to remuneration, usually for authors or performers, that survives the transfer of certain exclusive rights.

United States
There are several different compulsory license provisions in United States copyright law, including for non-dramatic musical compositions, public broadcasting, retransmission by cable systems, subscription digital audio transmission, and non-subscription digital audio transmission such as Internet radio. The compulsory license for non-dramatic musical compositions under Section 115 of the Copyright Act of 1976  allows a person to distribute a new sound recording of a musical work, if that has been previously distributed to the public, by or under the authority of the copyright owner. There is no requirement that the new recording be identical to the previous work, as the compulsory license includes the privilege of rearranging the work to conform it to the recording artist's interpretation. This does not allow the artist to change the basic melody or fundamental character of the work. In order to take advantage of this compulsory license the recording artist must provide notice and pay a royalty. The notice must be sent to the copyright owner, or if unable to determine the copyright owner, to the Copyright Office, within thirty days of making the recording, but before distributing physical copies. Failure to provide this notice would constitute copyright infringement. In addition to the notice to the copyright owner, the recording artist must pay a royalty to the copyright owner. This royalty is set by three copyright royalty judges. Though the compulsory license allows one to make and distribute physical copies of a song for a set royalty, the owner of the copyright in the underlying musical composition can still control public performance of the work or transmission over the radio. If the underlying musical work is well known, the work can be licensed for public performance through a performance rights organization such as ASCAP, BMI, or SESAC.

According to Register of Copyrights, Marybeth Peters, use of the section 115 license prior to the 1995 enactment of the Digital Performance Right in Sound Recordings Act was extremely rare, with the U.S. Copyright Office receiving fewer than 20 notices of such licenses per year.  By 2003, that number had risen to 214, which, while higher, was not considered by the Register to be significant.

Patents

Many patent law systems provide for the granting of compulsory licenses in a variety of situations. The Paris Convention of 1883 provides that each contracting State may take legislative measures for the grant of compulsory licenses. Article 5A.(2) of the Paris Convention reads:
Each country of the Union shall have the right to take legislative measures providing for the grant of compulsory licenses to prevent the abuses which might result from the exercise of the exclusive rights conferred by the patent, for example, failure to work. (See also Article 5A.(3) to (5) of the Paris Convention.)

According to historian Adrian Johns, the idea of compulsory licensing "seems to have originated as a serious proposition in the 1830s, although predecessors can be traced back into the eighteenth century," and it was popular in the British anti-patent movement of the 1850s and 1860s. More recently an area of fierce debate has been that of drugs for treating serious diseases such as malaria, HIV and AIDS. Such drugs are widely available in the western world and would help to manage the epidemic of these diseases in developing countries.  However, such drugs are too expensive for developing countries and generally protected by patents.

United States
In the United States, if the federal government or one of its contractors infringes a patent, the only remedy available to patent holders is a lawsuit in the Court of Federal Claims. It is the policy of the U.S. Department of Defense to allow contractors to infringe patents and to defend the contractor against patent infringement claims at government expense. Use of this provision by agencies other than Department of Defense is rare. During the 2001 anthrax attacks through the US Postal Service, the US government threatened to issue a compulsory license for the antibiotic drug ciprofloxacin, if the patent owner, Bayer, didn't lower the price to the government. Bayer lowered the price and the government backed down on the threat.

India
In India, compulsory license may be issued by the Controller General of Patents, Designs and Trade Marks under section 84(1) of The Patents Act, 1970, if:

 The reasonable requirements of the public with respect to the patented invention have not been satisfied, or,
 the patented invention is not available to the public at a reasonably affordable price, or,
 the patented invention is not worked  in the territory of India.

In March 2012, India granted its first compulsory license ever to Indian generic drug manufacturer Natco Pharma for Sorafenib tosylate, a cancer drug patented by Bayer.

Agreement on Trade-Related Aspects of Intellectual Property Rights (TRIPs) 
The Agreement on Trade-Related Aspects of Intellectual Property Rights (TRIPs) also sets out specific provisions that shall be followed if a compulsory license is issued, and the requirements of such licenses.  All significant patent systems comply with the requirements of TRIPs. The principal requirement for the issue of a compulsory license is that attempts to obtain a license under reasonable commercial terms must have failed over a reasonable period of time.  Specific situations in which compulsory licenses may be issued are set out in the legislation of each patent system and vary between systems.  Some examples of situations in which a compulsory license may be granted include lack of working over an extended period in the territory of the patent, inventions funded by the government, failure or inability of a patentee to meet a demand for a patented product and where the refusal to grant a license leads to the inability to exploit an important technological advance, or to exploit a further patent. TRIPs also provides that the requirements for a compulsory license may be waived in certain situations, in particular cases of national emergency or extreme urgency or in cases of public non-commercial use. Article 31.f of TRIPS requires that compulsory licenses be used "predominantly" for local markets, a requirement that complicates the ability of countries to import drugs manufactured overseas.

Doha Declaration 
This issue of compulsory licensing of drugs treating serious diseases was addressed by the Doha Declaration which recognized the problem and required the TRIPs council to find a solution. On 17 May 2006 the European Commission's official journal published Regulation 816/2006, which brings into force the provisions of the Doha Declaration. This means that the declaration now has legal effect in the European Union, and also in Canada who implemented it in 2005.  The declaration allows compulsory licenses to be issued in developed countries for the manufacture of patented drugs, provided they are exported to certain countries (principally, those on the UN's list of least-developed countries and certain other countries having per-capita incomes of less than US$745 a year). This is not limited to only least-developed countries - every country that is a member of the WTO has the right under the TRIPs agreement to issue a compulsory license if there is a public health need. Some countries simply choose not to issue these licenses. From the text of the agreement: "Each member has the right to grant compulsory licences and the freedom to determine the grounds upon which such licences are granted."

See also
 Agreement on Trade-Related Aspects of Intellectual Property Rights
 Canada's Access to Medicines Regime
 Copyright collective
 Extended collective licensing
 Doha Declaration
 Intellectual property
 Mechanical license
 Open Music Model
 Orphaned Works
 Pharmaceutical company
 Webcasting
 Section 115 Reform Act of 2006 (United States)

References

Copyright licenses
Patent law